9α-Fluorocortisone, also known as alfluorone, is a synthetic glucocorticoid corticosteroid which was never marketed.

References

Diols
Fluoroarenes
Glucocorticoids
Pregnanes
Triketones